The Keewatin Region was a distinct entity from the District of Keewatin, although much of their territory overlapped.

The Keewatin Region was a region of the Northwest Territories, in use as an administrative and statistical division until the creation of Nunavut in 1999. The majority of Keewatin Region fell on the Nunavut side of the boundary and was reconstituted as Kivalliq Region within the new territory, while a strip on the region's west side remaining in the NWT was transferred to Fort Smith Region. Kivalliq continues to be referred to as "Keewatin Region, Nunavut" in some circumstances, such as by Statistics Canada.

The regional seat of the Keewatin Region was Rankin Inlet.

Further reading

 Anawak, Caroline, and Meryl Cook. Keewatin Suicide Prevention and Intervention Study. Rankin Inlet, N.W.T.: Kivalliq Consulting, Management and Training Services, 1986. 
 Tella, Subhas. Precambrian Geology of Parts of Tavani, Marble Island, and Chesterfield Inlet Map Areas, District of Keewatin A Progress Report. [Ottawa], Canada: Geological Survey of Canada, 1986. 

History of the Northwest Territories
Historical census divisions of Canada
1999 disestablishments in the Northwest Territories